"Layers of Time" is a song by Italian gothic metal band Lacuna Coil. It was released as the lead single from their ninth studio album Black Anima on July 26, 2019 by their record label Century Media Records and accompanied by a music video. This is the first Lacuna Coil single released since "Blood, Tears, Dust", which was released on March 22, 2017, as well as their first single without their former drummer Ryan Blake Folden, who stepped down as the band's full time drummer to "undertake new adventures his life".

Critical reception
Axl Rosenberg of Metal Sucks said that "'Layers of Time' suggests that the album won't be anticlimactic", then added, "It's every bit as catchy as anything the band has ever released, sure, but catchy is where Lacuna Coil live. What sets the track apart from other entries in the Coil catalogue is its heaviness."

Music video
A music video directed by Robert "SaKu" Cinardi was released alongside the song on July 26. It was shot inside a rural palace called Villa Arconati located in Bollate, a commune in Lombardy, a region of Italy.

References

2019 singles
2019 songs
Lacuna Coil songs
Century Media Records singles
Songs written by Andrea Ferro
Songs written by Cristina Scabbia
Metalcore songs